The Journal of Mass Spectrometry is a peer-reviewed scientific journal covering all aspects of mass spectrometry including instrument design and development, ionization processes, mechanisms and energetics of gaseous ion reactions, spectroscopy of gaseous ions, theoretical aspects, ion structure, analysis of compounds of biological interest, methodology development, applications to elemental analysis and inorganic chemistry, computer-related applications and developments, and environmental chemistry and other fields that use innovative aspects of mass spectrometry. It was established in 1968 as Organic Mass Spectrometry and obtained its current title in 1995.

According to the Journal Citation Reports, the journal has a 2020 impact factor of 1.982.

See also
 Mass Spectrometry Reviews
Rapid Communications in Mass Spectrometry

References

External links 
 

Mass spectrometry journals
Publications established in 1995
Wiley (publisher) academic journals
Monthly journals
English-language journals